Taylor Jackson Kinney (born July 15, 1981) is an American actor and model. He has played Mason Lockwood in The Vampire Diaries, Jared in Zero Dark Thirty, Phil in The Other Woman, and Chicago Fire Department Lieutenant Kelly Severide on the American drama Chicago Fire.

Early life and education 
Taylor Jackson Kinney was born in Lancaster, Pennsylvania.

In 2000, he graduated from Lancaster Mennonite School. Kinney studied Business Management at West Virginia University in Morgantown, West Virginia.

Career 
Kinney played Luke Gianni on Fashion House (2006) on MyNetworkTV, and played Glenn Morrison on Trauma on NBC. Kinney had a recurring role on the supernatural drama The Vampire Diaries, joining the cast during the second season as Mason Lockwood. In 2011, Kinney was featured in Lady Gaga's music video for the song "You and I".

In 2012, Kinney landed a starring role on Chicago Fire, a drama series that follows the lives of firefighters and paramedics. Kinney plays Lieutenant Kelly Severide on Rescue Squad 3 opposite former House star Jesse Spencer. Also in 2012, Kinney appeared on the big screen in Kathryn Bigelow's acclaimed war drama Zero Dark Thirty. In 2012, he guest starred on Shameless as Craig, the former high school crush of the lead character Fiona (played by Emmy Rossum).

Personal life 

Kinney began dating singer-songwriter Lady Gaga in July 2011. They first met in Nebraska while working on the music video for her song "You and I", and started dating soon afterwards. They became engaged in February 2015, but ended up calling off their engagement in July 2016.

Filmography

Film

Television

Music videos

Awards and nominations

References

External links 
 
 

1981 births
21st-century American male actors
Actors from Lancaster, Pennsylvania
American male film actors
American male television actors
Living people
Male actors from Pennsylvania
Male models from Pennsylvania
West Virginia University alumni